Sunday Summit (el. ) is a highway summit along the Crowsnest Highway in British Columbia, Canada. It is the second-highest point on the highway between the cities of Hope and Princeton - the highest being Allison Pass, located to the west. It is located just east of the eastern boundary to Manning Park.

References

Similkameen Country
Mountain passes of British Columbia
Canadian Cascades